Stuart Max Walters (born Oughtibridge, Sheffield, Yorkshire 23 May 1920 – died Grantchester, Cambridgeshire 11 December 2005) was a British botanist and academic. 

As a conscientious objector in the Second World War, he worked as a hospital orderly in Sheffield and Bristol. He was Curator of the Herbarium, Botany School, University of Cambridge 1949–73, Lecturer in Botany 1962–73, and for the ten years up until his retirement, 1973–83, Director of the University Botanic Garden in Cambridge, of which he wrote a history. He was a Research Fellow at St John's College, Cambridge 1948-51 and Fellow of King's College, Cambridge 1964–84.

He was the author of numerous books on plants and flowers, most notably the 1964 Atlas of the British Flora (with Franklyn Perring) and as a co-editor of Flora Europaea. He wrote two well-known books for the New Naturalist library, Wild Flowers (1954, co-written with John Gilmour) and Mountain Flowers (1956, with John Raven). He was much involved in the research and management of Wicken Fen.  After his retirement, he wrote a biography of Darwin's teacher and friend, John Stevens Henslow, Darwin's mentor (2001).

Walters was a committed Christian who was much involved both in the local life of the Church of England (he was a churchwarden at Grantchester for many years) and in the application of Christian principles to national and social life: he was a Christian socialist and also a Christian pacifist, and as such was a leading member of the Fellowship of Reconciliation and also active in the Campaign for Nuclear Disarmament.

References

Bibliography

 
 
 Obituary in the 2006 Annual Report of King's College Cambridge

External links
 
 Obituary. The Independent

1920 births
2005 deaths
People from Oughtibridge
English botanists
British conscientious objectors
Alumni of St John's College, Cambridge
Fellows of St John's College, Cambridge
Fellows of King's College, Cambridge
English Christian socialists
English Christian pacifists
Anglican pacifists
New Naturalist writers
Anglican socialists

People educated at Penistone Grammar School